Baasha son of Rehob was the king of Ammon in 853 BCE. 

Along with Bar-Hadad II of Damascus, Ahab of the Kingdom of Israel, the Arab king Gindibu, and a coalition of other Levantine monarchs, Baasha fought against the Assyrian king Shalmaneser III at the Battle of Qarqar.

References
Rendsberg, Gary. "Baasha of Ammon". JANES 20:57 (1991).

External links
Livius.org
Jewish Encyclopedia.com

Kings of Ammon
9th-century BC rulers
9th-century BC people